The Pizzey Ministry was the 37th ministry of the Government of Queensland and was led by Country Party Premier Jack Pizzey and Liberal Deputy Premier Gordon Chalk. It succeeded the Nicklin Ministry on 17 January 1968 when Nicklin retired from politics, and was in turn succeeded by the Chalk Ministry on 1 August 1968 following Pizzey's unexpected death on 31 July.

On 17 January 1968, the Governor designated 13 principal executive offices of the Government and appointed the following Members of the Legislative Assembly of Queensland to the Ministry as follows. Blue entries indicate members of the Liberal Party.

References
 
 

Queensland ministries